is an airport in Misawa, a city in the Aomori Prefecture of Japan. It shares facilities and airport codes with the Misawa Air Base.

History

An Imperial Japanese Navy Air Service base was established at Misawa in 1941, and nearby Lake Ogawara was reportedly one of the locations used by the Imperial Japanese Navy to practice for the attack on Pearl Harbor due to its shallow depth. The base was heavily bombed by the United States Navy in 1945, and subsequently occupied by the United States after the surrender of Japan at the end of World War II. The first Misawa Airport was opened on January 11, 1952, with Japan Airlines providing scheduled services to Haneda Airport in Tokyo and Chitose Airport in Hokkaidō. However, commercial operations were suspended from March 31, 1965, due to pressure from the United States, citing safety and security concerns, and flight operations were transferred to nearby JMSDF Hachinohe Air Base. Misawa Airport reopened on May 10, 1975, with a new terminal building completed in 1977; the terminal was expanded and rebuilt in 1986.

Initially served by Toa Airways with McDonnell Douglas DC-9 and MD-80 aircraft to Tokyo (Haneda), Sapporo (Chitose), and Osaka Itami, operations were upgraded to Airbus A300 aircraft after Toa Airways became Japan Air System in 1988. These flights were taken over by Japan Airlines after its acquisition of Japan Air System in 2002. However, with the opening of the Tōhoku Shinkansen to Hachinohe in December 2002, the number of passengers has decreased and equipment changed back to the MD-80. Flights to Chitose were discontinued in 2007.

Airlines and destinations

Ground transportion

Buses

Towada Kankō Electric Railway operates the following buses:

References

External links

Misawa Airport Terminal Company

Airports in Japan
Transport in Aomori Prefecture
Japan Air Self-Defense Force bases
Buildings and structures in Aomori Prefecture
Misawa, Aomori